Kareem Sherlock Queeley (born 30 March 2001) is a Kittitian-British professional basketball player for the London Lions of the British Basketball League (BBL).

Early life and career
Queeley grew up playing football and joined the Leicester Warriors basketball club at age nine. He was dominant at the youth level in England, recording multiple 90-point and 80-point games. In February 2015, he played for Real Madrid at the Minicopa Endesa, an under-14 tournament in Spain. He was named most valuable player after recording 36 points and 13 rebounds in a win over Unicaja Málaga in the title game. In September, he signed a multi-year junior contract with Real Madrid.

On 8 August 2019, Queeley signed with San Pablo Burgos of the Liga ACB. He competed for the club's reserve team, Nissan Grupo de Santiago, in the Liga EBA for much of the season. On 29 January 2020, he debuted for the senior team in a Basketball Champions League loss to Hapoel Jerusalem. In October, he was on the roster of the Burgos team that won the 2019–20 Basketball Champions League.

National team career
Queeley played for England at the 2015 FIBA Europe Under-16 Championship in Kaunas, averaging 3.5 points per game in a limited role. At the 2016 FIBA U16 European Championship Division B in Sofia, he averaged 12.2 points, seven rebounds and 2.5 assists per game and leading England to fifth place. Queeley represented Great Britain at the 2018 FIBA U18 European Championship in Latvia, averaging 12.4 points, 4.7 rebounds and three assists per game. At the 2019 FIBA U20 European Championship in Tel Aviv, he averaged 12.3 points and four rebounds per game for Great Britain.

Personal life
Kareem is the son of Emma Queeley.

References

External links
Liga ACB profile
Real Madrid bio

2001 births
Living people
British men's basketball players
British expatriate basketball people in Spain
CB Miraflores players
Saint Kitts and Nevis sportspeople
Shooting guards